Philadelphia Olando (born February 18, 1990) is a Kenyan rugby sevens player. She competed at the 2016 Summer Olympics as the captain of the Kenya women's national rugby sevens team .

References

External links 
 Player Profile
 

1990 births
Living people
Female rugby sevens players
Rugby sevens players at the 2016 Summer Olympics
Olympic rugby sevens players of Kenya
Kenya international rugby sevens players
Rugby sevens players at the 2020 Summer Olympics
Kenya international women's rugby sevens players